Maite Gabarrús-Alonso (born 2 February 1989) is a Spanish former professional tennis player, and currently a professional padel player.

Gabarrús-Alonso, a native of Pamplona, reached a career high singles ranking of 331 in the world and qualified for her only WTA Tour main draw at the 2008 Barcelona Ladies Open.

ITF finals

Singles: 5 (3–2)

Doubles: 5 (2–3)

References

External links
 
 

1989 births
Living people
Spanish female tennis players
Female tennis players playing padel
Sportspeople from Pamplona